Altaysky District (Khakas: , Altay aymağı) is an administrative and municipal district (raion), one of the eight in the Republic of Khakassia, Russia. It is located in the east of the republic. Its administrative center is the rural locality (a selo) of Bely Yar. Population:  The population of Bely Yar accounts for 39.1% of the district's total population.

References

Notes

Sources

Districts of Khakassia